Simon Thomas John Cowley (born 8 November 1979) is a former English cricketer.  Cowley was a right-handed batsman who bowled right-arm off break.  He was born at Welwyn Garden City, Hertfordshire.

Cowley played a single Minor Counties Championship match in 1999 for Herefordshire against Oxfordshire.

In 2000, he represented the Gloucestershire Cricket Board in a single List A match against the Derbyshire Cricket Board in the 2000 NatWest Trophy at the Town Ground, Heanor.  In his only List A match, he scored 8 runs.

References

External links
Simon Cowley at Cricinfo
Simon Cowley at CricketArchive

1979 births
Living people
Sportspeople from Welwyn Garden City
English cricketers
Herefordshire cricketers
Gloucestershire Cricket Board cricketers

ta:சைமன் கவ்லி